Whittier School is a historic building located in Waterloo, Iowa, United States.  The city's west side began a period of rapid growth in the 1890s.  By 1904 the property for this school had been purchased for $9,270.  Waterloo architect John G. Ralston designed this and the new Emerson School at the same time, and they both opened in 1906.  Whitter was part of the development of Waterloo's streetcar subdivisions during the city's housing boom from 1900 to 1920.  It was built in four phases between 1906 and 1915.  Its H-shape design is an example of the "Platoon School" design, which was meant to improve the health and education of the students by providing more windows for better ventilation and lighting.  The structure is also reminiscent of the American Foursquare houses in the surrounding neighborhoods.  The building was closed in 1981, and it was later sold.  It was listed on the National Register of Historic Places in 2004.  The former school has been converted into apartments for low to moderate income people.

References

School buildings completed in 1906
Defunct schools in Iowa
Renaissance Revival architecture in Iowa
Buildings and structures in Waterloo, Iowa
National Register of Historic Places in Black Hawk County, Iowa
School buildings on the National Register of Historic Places in Iowa
Apartment buildings in Iowa
1906 establishments in Iowa